The Californian anchovy or northern anchovy (Engraulis mordax)  is a species of anchovy found in the Pacific Ocean, ranging from Mexico to British Columbia.

Relationship with humans

Commercial fishing
As sardine populations declined in the Pacific during the 1940s and 50's, fish packers in America started canning the more abundant local anchovies. Total hauls increased over this time from 960 tons in 1946 to 9,464 tons in 1947 and peaking at almost 43,000 tons in 1953. From 1949 to 1955, they were restricted for all uses but bait fish in California. In 2010, reported American hauls totaled 2,100 metric tons. Most Californian anchovies today are fished for use in animal feed and as bait fish.

Recreational fishing
They are taken by anglers for use as bait or for personal consumption.

References

External links
 

California anchovy
Western North American coastal fauna
Fish of the Western United States
Fauna of California
Anchovies
California anchovy